The 2019 SAFF U-15 Women's Championship was the 3rd edition of the SAFF U-15 Women's Championship, an international football competition for women's under-15 national teams organized by SAFF. The tournament was hosted by Thimpu, Bhutan from 9 October to 15 October 2019. Four teams from the region will take part.

Squads
Players born on or after 1 January 2004 are eligible to compete in the tournament. Each team have to register a squad of minimum 18 players and maximum 23 players, minimum three of whom had to be goalkeepers.

Participating nations

Venue

Round robin 
All the four teams will play each other in a round robin phase and the top two teams will play the final.

All matches will be played at Thimphu, Bhutan.
Times listed are UTC+06:00.

</onlyinclude>

Final

Awards

Goalscorers

Broadcasting rights

References

2019
2019 in women's association football
2019 in Asian football
2019 in Bhutanese football
2019–20 in Nepalese football
2019–20 in Indian football
2019 in Bangladeshi football
2019 in Maldivian football
2019–20 in Pakistani football
2019–20 in Sri Lankan football
International association football competitions hosted by Bhutan
2019 in youth association football